Nanoleaf is a consumer electronics company specializing in LED lighting. The limited company was founded in 2012 by three engineers, and launched its first two products with crowdfunding campaigns on Kickstarter.

History
Nanoleaf was founded in 2012 by three friends and University of Toronto engineering graduates Gimmy Chu, Christian Yan, and Tom Rodinger. They were each working in different industries after graduation while creating Nanoleaf on the side. After a year, the three quit their jobs to develop the company full-time. In January 2013, Nanoleaf launched their first product on Kickstarter.  The crowdfunding campaign for NanoLight (later renamed Nanoleaf One) received $250,000 from the crowdfunding site, with an initial goal of $20,000. Following the success of this campaign, Nanoleaf received funding from Horizons Ventures, an investment company owned by Li Ka Shing, and Silicon Valley venture capital firm Kleiner Perkins.  The company also opened their first offices in Shenzhen, China, and Hong Kong.

Their second Kickstarter campaign for the Nanoleaf Bloom in July 2014 generated $200,000 in funding with a goal of $20,000.

Nanoleaf opened their Headquarters in Toronto, Canada, in January 2015. In 2017, the company launched in Europe and Australia. Their European office opened in Paris, France, in April 2018.

Technology

Nanoleaf uses LED lighting technology that encourages energy efficiency.

The company's first products included lightbulbs made up of small LEDs on a folded circuit board and feature an origami-like design. The technology eliminates the need for a heat sink, keeping the bulb cool to the touch, while reducing the amount of energy used during manufacturing and increasing its potential life span.

Nanoleaf introduced a new lighting technology with its smart modular light panels, first revealed at the 2016 Consumer Electronics Show. The light panels, part of the company's 'Smarter Series' of products, have smart capabilities (via WiFi) including app and voice commands, music sync and touch controls. The light panels are made with LED chips on a printed circuit board and feature a diffuser on a flat surface. 

In 2020, the Essentials line of smart Bulbs & Lightstrips launched and were Nanoleaf's first products using Thread technology, developed as a faster and more secure network connection for smart home products.  More recently, they announced a series of Bulbs & Lightstrips to the Essentials line that will work with Matter technology.   Matter is a smart home protocol aimed at unifying the different connected devices in your home for easier setup and daily use.

Philanthropy

Masks 
At the start of the COVID-19 pandemic in 2020 Nanoleaf pivoted their focus to creating and distributing masks to frontline workers to supplement the PPE shortage. In total, they were able to donate over 600k masks to frontline workers and provide one million at a cost to other organizations in need.

Charitable Organizations 
In December 2020 Nanoleaf collaborated with KultureCity, a charitable organization, that focuses on those with sensory needs, to create sensory rooms in public venues. These spaces would serve as a decompression area for individuals with autism, PTSD, and other sensory sensitivities and needs. Nanoleaf provided the organization with their Canvas light panels which were installed in the spaces with the aim of creating soothing environments with gentle colors and light. The first such installation was built in the Georgia Aquarium, with both Nanoleaf and KultureCity making the commitment to continue creating additional rooms across the United States.

References

External links
 

Companies established in 2012
Manufacturing companies based in Shenzhen
Manufacturing companies based in Toronto